Murad Yusupovich Osmanov (born 15 May 1985), known professionally as Murad Osmann, is a Russian photographer based in Moscow. His series  "Follow Me To", made with his wife Natalia Zakharova, went viral in 2012, and the couple have since been named as top travel influencers.

Biography and career
Osmann was born in the mountains of Dagestan, Russia. In 1990, when he was five years old, his family moved to Moscow. In 2001, he went to England to pursue a degree in civil engineering at Imperial College London. Osmann told FabWeb, “Photography is about capturing things other people might miss. It is a way to communicate, a way to bring images that I hold in my mind to the surface.”

Osmann is a leading Travel influencer with an influencer score of 96, from influencer marketing platform Klear. Osmann is best known for the "Follow Me" project that began in Barcelona, Spain in 2011 when his then-girlfriend, Natalia Zakharova, became annoyed each time he kept stopping to take photos. She would pull him away, but he took the photograph anyway, this sparked the "Follow Me" series.  According to Osmann, Nataly's impatience was the inspiration behind what has since become a social media phenomenon. Osman currently has 4.1 million followers on his Instagram account. Originally all #Followmeto photos were made on an iPhone, but recently Osmann is using a DSLR camera to have a wider field of view.

On Saturday, 6 June 2015, Osmann and Zakharova got married. The pair had two weddings, one in Moscow and the second one at Murad's birthplace in Dagestan. The photographer captured moments from their wedding to include in the "Follow Me" series.

Books
In 2015, Skyhorse Publishing published Follow Me To: A Journey (a life)Around the World Through the Eyes of Two Ordinary Travelers by Murad Osmann and Nataly Zakharova.

References

External links
 Instagram Account
 Photographer Website
 Photographer Facebook Page
 Follow Me Project Facebook

Travel photographers
Russian photographers
Fashion photographers
Russian people of Dagestani descent
1985 births
Living people